Karbach Brewing Company is a craft brewery based in Houston, Texas. Since 2016, it has been owned by Anheuser-Busch InBev. It was founded in 2011, when beverage industry veterans Chuck Robertson and Ken Goodman (of distributor C.R. Goodman) joined with Eric Warner, the former brewmaster and CEO of Flying Dog, on a new venture. The brewery is named for its location on Karbach Street in Houston's Spring Branch neighborhood.

In 2013, The New Yorker noted that Karbach was the second fastest-growing craft brewery in the U.S. In 2015, Karbach completed renovations on a  expansion to its brewhouse, which also added an on-site restaurant.

Karbach was acquired by Anheuser-Busch InBev on November 3, 2016.

References

External links
 Official website

Culture of Houston
Food and drink companies based in Houston
Manufacturing companies based in Houston
Beer brewing companies based in Texas